VSO may refer to:
 VSO, an aircraft's stall speed in the landing configuration
 Valdosta Southern Railroad
 Vancouver Symphony Orchestra, a Canadian orchestra performing in Vancouver, British Columbia
 Variable Speed Oscillator - see Oscillation
 Verb–subject–object in Linguistic typology
 Vermont Symphony Orchestra, a symphony orchestra based in, and supported in part by, the U.S. state of Vermont
 Veteran Service Organization
 Victoria State Opera, Australian opera company, merged in 1996 with Opera Australia
 Vienna State Opera, an opera house – and opera company – with a history dating back to the mid-19th century
 Vienna Symphony Orchestra
 Violin Shaped Object, a pejorative term for a low-quality violin
 Visual Studio Online, an early name for Azure DevOps (previously Visual Studio Team Services), a hosted application lifecycle management service from Microsoft
 Voluntary Service Overseas, an international development charity
 Volvo Super Olympian, double-decker bus